This article lists all games that are restricted in their online functionality. Most of them were affected by the GameSpy Server shutdown, but there could be other reasons. This knowledge is important when buying used/old games and emphasizes the dependency on online services the publisher provides.

References

GameSpy
Online games
Restricted online functionality